Dweck is a common last name in the Jewish Community. It belongs primarily to Sephardic Jews and are usually kohanim. Its meaning in English is "vessel maker."

People 

 Carol Dweck – Educator known for her work on mindsets
 Esther Dweck – Brazilian economist and researcher
 Joseph Dweck – Senior rabbi of the S&P Sephardi Community of the United Kingdom
 Michael Dweck – American visual artist and filmmaker
 Solomon Dwek – Felon, turned FBI informant
 Stephan Dweck – African-American humorist

Variations
There are certain variations in the spelling of the name. Generally, those beginning with the letters DW are of Syrian descent; while those starting with the letters DOU are of Egyptian origin. The starting of the name with the letters "DOU" denotes a French spelling of the name. This follows through the early part of the 20th century, when certain Middle-eastern countries were under French influence in some way. Additionally as an example, when Egyptian Jews migrated away from Egypt during the late 1950s and early 1960s, they were not allowed to emigrate to countries considered enemies of the state, notably Israel. Many chose to make their way to the United States via Europe as a stop-over point. Initially, some settled in countries like France, and therefore had a French spelling of their name stamped on their immigration papers. Hence the surname Doueck instead of Dweck. Below are additional spellings:

Dweck
Dwek
Doueck
Douek
Douak 
Dueck
Duek
Dweik
Duwayk

References